The canton of Villeneuve-sur-Aisne (before 2021: canton of Guignicourt) is an administrative division of the Aisne department, in northern France. It was created at the French canton reorganisation which came into effect in March 2015. Its seat is in Villeneuve-sur-Aisne.

It consists of the following communes: 
 
Aguilcourt 
Aizelles
Amifontaine
Aubigny-en-Laonnois
Beaurieux
Berrieux
Berry-au-Bac
Bertricourt
Boncourt 
Bouconville-Vauclair
Bouffignereux
Bourg-et-Comin
Braye-en-Laonnois
Bucy-lès-Pierrepont
Chaudardes 
Chermizy-Ailles
Chevregny
Chivres-en-Laonnois
Concevreux
Condé-sur-Suippe
Corbeny
Coucy-lès-Eppes
Courtrizy-et-Fussigny
Craonne
Craonnelle 
Cuiry-lès-Chaudardes
Cuissy-et-Geny
Ébouleau
Évergnicourt
Gizy
Goudelancourt-lès-Berrieux
Goudelancourt-lès-Pierrepont
Guyencourt
Jumigny
Juvincourt-et-Damary
Lappion
Liesse-Notre-Dame 
Lor
Mâchecourt
Maizy
La Malmaison
Marchais
Mauregny-en-Haye
Meurival
Missy-lès-Pierrepont
Montaigu
Moulins
Moussy-Verneuil
Muscourt
Neufchâtel-sur-Aisne 
Neuville-sur-Ailette
Nizy-le-Comte
Œuilly
Orainville
Oulches-la-Vallée-Foulon
Paissy
Pancy-Courtecon
Pargnan
Pignicourt
Ployart-et-Vaurseine
Pontavert
Prouvais
Proviseux-et-Plesnoy
Roucy
Sainte-Croix
Sainte-Preuve
Saint-Erme-Outre-et-Ramecourt
Saint-Thomas
La Selve
Sissonne
Trucy
Variscourt
Vassogne
Vendresse-Beaulne
La Ville-aux-Bois-lès-Pontavert
Villeneuve-sur-Aisne

References

Cantons of Aisne